The Battle of Oraovica was a conflict between army and police of FR Yugoslavia and Albanian militant group Liberation Army of Preševo, Medveđa and Bujanovac (UÇPMB) during the 2001 insurgency in the Preševo Valley. Village of Oraovica was under the control of UÇPMB. On 14 May Yugoslav forces launched an attack on UÇPMB stronghold in this Albanian-populated place near the border with Kosovo. Fighting began on 13 May at 6:10 a.m. by an attack on Yugoslav forces. At 7:00 a.m. Albanian men attacked Serbian police and army again and fired three rocket towards the village. More incidents happened during the day until 8:00 p.m. On 14 May, Serbian forces captured Oraovica after the UÇPMB attacked them at 2:15 p.m.

References 

Albanian nationalism in Serbia
Oraovica
Preševo Valley
Serbia and Montenegro
Yugoslav Wars
2001 in Yugoslavia
Oraovica
Oraovica
Oraovica
May 2001 events in Europe